The 2022 Cazoo World Cup of Darts was the twelfth edition of the PDC World Cup of Darts. It took place from 16–19 June 2022 at the Eissporthalle in Frankfurt, Germany.

Scotland (Peter Wright and John Henderson) were the defending champions, after beating Austria (Mensur Suljović and Rowby-John Rodriguez) 3–1 in the 2021 final. However, they lost 2–0 to England (Michael Smith and James Wade) in the quarter-finals.

Australia (Damon Heta and Simon Whitlock) won their first World Cup, beating Wales (Jonny Clayton and Gerwyn Price) 3–1 in the final.

For the first time in the tournament's history, the eight seeds all made the quarter-final stage.

Format
The tournament remained at 32 teams this year, with the top 8 teams being seeded and the remaining 24 teams being unseeded in the first round.

As with recent years, the tournament continued to be a straight knockout.

First round: Best of nine legs doubles.
Second round, quarter and semi-finals: Two best of seven legs singles matches. If the scores were tied, a best of seven legs doubles match settled the match.
Final: Three points needed to win the title. Two best of seven legs singles matches were played, followed by a best of seven doubles match. If necessary, one or two best of seven legs singles matches in reverse order were played to determine the champion.

There were rumours that a format shakeup, like with the 2022 Premier League Darts, might be in the offing, but that was put on hold for at least another year.

Prize money
Total prize money remained at £350,000.

The prize money per team was:

Teams and seedings
On 23 May, the 32 competing countries were announced, with three changes from the 2021 tournament. Russia didn't participate owing to them being suspended because of the invasion in Ukraine, China couldn't compete owing to ongoing COVID-19 restrictions, and Greece weren't invited back. Returning after a one-year absence were Latvia and New Zealand, and returning after not appearing since the 2018 event were Switzerland.

All players named on the seeded nations are the top 2 of each nation on the PDC Order of Merit. Players on the unseeded nations list are players chosen by qualification tournaments specifically for this event.

On 6 May, it was confirmed that John Henderson would represent Scotland after winning the title as part of the 2021 team, despite him being the 6th ranked Scottish player on the Order of Merit. On 30 May, it was announced that Dutch number one Michael van Gerwen had withdrawn due to required arm surgery, and he was replaced by Dutch number three Dirk van Duijvenbode.

The pairings were officially confirmed on 1 June.

The Top 8 nations based on combined Order of Merit rankings were seeded.

Seeded nations

Unseeded Nations

Results

Draw
The draw was made on 9 June by Barry Hearn.

Second round
Two best of seven legs singles matches. If the scores were tied, a best of seven legs doubles match settled the match.

Quarter-finals
Two best of seven legs singles matches. If the scores were tied, a best of seven legs doubles match settled the match.

Semi-finals
Two best of seven legs singles matches. If the scores were tied, a best of seven legs doubles match settled the match.

Final
Three match wins were needed to win the title. Two best of seven legs singles matches followed by a best of seven doubles match. If necessary, one or two best of seven legs reverse singles matches were played to determine the champion.

References

PDC World Cup of Darts
World Cup
PDC
PDC